The following is a list of Sri Lankan politicians.

National

President

Prime Minister

Speaker of the Parliament

Leader of the Opposition (Sri Lanka)

Cabinet Ministers

Agriculture Ministers

Defence Ministers

Education Ministers

Finance Ministers

Foreign Ministers

Health Ministers

Home Affairs Ministers

Housing Ministers

Industries Ministers

Justice Ministers

Labour Ministers

Post & Telecommunications

Sports Ministers

Trade Ministers

Transport Ministers

Members of the Sri Lankan Parliament

1st State Council of Ceylon

2nd State Council of Ceylon

1st Parliament of Ceylon

2nd Parliament of Ceylon

3rd Parliament of Ceylon

4th Parliament of Ceylon

5th Parliament of Ceylon

6th Parliament of Ceylon

7th Parliament of Ceylon

1st National State Assembly

2nd National State Assembly

8th Parliament of Sri Lanka

9th Parliament of Sri Lanka

10th Parliament of Sri Lanka

11th Parliament of Sri Lanka

12th Parliament of Sri Lanka

13th Parliament of Sri Lanka

14th Parliament of Sri Lanka

15th Parliament of Sri Lanka

Former

Legislative Council of Ceylon

Senate of Ceylon

President of the Senate of Ceylon

Provincial

Provincial Governors

Chief Minister

See also

 
Politicians